Emily Beth Quarton (born ) is a Canadian female weightlifter, competing in the 58 kg category and representing Canada at international competitions. She competed at world championships, most recently at the 2010 World Weightlifting Championships. and won a silver medal at the 2006 Melbourne Commonwealth Games  and placed fifth at the 2010 Delhi Commonwealth Games.

Quarton lives in Whitehorse, Yukon and is an elementary school teacher.

Major results

References

1984 births
Living people
Canadian female weightlifters
Place of birth missing (living people)
Weightlifters at the 2006 Commonwealth Games
Weightlifters at the 2010 Commonwealth Games
Commonwealth Games medallists in weightlifting
Commonwealth Games silver medallists for Canada
21st-century Canadian women
Medallists at the 2006 Commonwealth Games